Seyyed Razi (also Romanized as Seyyed Rāẕī; also known as Razī and Shahīd Moţahharī) is a village in Hoseynabad Rural District, in the Central District of Shush County, Khuzestan Province, Iran. At the 2006 census, its population was 1,376, in 260 families.

References 

Populated places in Shush County